Oman competed at the 2000 Summer Paralympics in Sydney, Australia. 3 competitors from Oman won no medals to finish joint 69th in the medal table along with all other countries who failed to win medals.

See also 
 Oman at the Paralympics
 Oman at the 2000 Summer Olympics

References 

Oman at the Paralympics
2000 in Omani sport
Nations at the 2000 Summer Paralympics